bio-bean is a company that has industrialised the process of recycling waste coffee grounds into advanced biofuels, biomass pellets and, in the near future biodiesel.

The company is located in London, England and has built the world's first waste coffee recycling factory in Cambridgeshire. It was founded in 2013 by Arthur Kay and Benjamin Harriman.

In 2014, the company was awarded £400,000 as the winner of the Postcode Lottery Green Challenge contest.

History
bio-bean was conceived whilst Arthur Kay and Benjamin Harriman were still architecture students at The Bartlett, University College London. Set the challenge of designing a coffee shop and roastery, Arthur realised that coffee was being wasted everywhere and set up bio-bean to recycle waste coffee grounds into advanced biofuels. His idea won awards and support from the Mayor of London, UCL, Tata, Santander and Shell. bio-bean became part of the Ellen MacArthur Foundation CE100 and their products were exhibited at The Science Museum. The company has also been awarded funding from Innovate UK.

bio-bean's London collection service was launched by Mayor Boris Johnson and conservative MP Zac Goldsmith and its 20,000 sq ft factory was opened in 2015, with the capacity to process 50,000 tonnes per year.

In 2015, Arthur Kay became the youngest ever Guardian Sustainable Business Leader of the Year. In 2016, bio-bean won the Virgin Media Business VOOM grow category.

In 2017, According to the reports, Bio-bean launched its ad campaign after winning Richard Branson's Virgin Voom competition

Waste coffee collection

bio-bean collects waste coffee grounds from hundreds of coffee shops, restaurants, office blocks and coffee factories.

Advanced biofuels
bio-bean's products are second-generation biofuels. Pellet fuels, namely biomass pellets, from waste coffee grounds are burned in biomass boilers as a sustainable, local renewable heat alternative. bio-bean also produces a briquette and barbecue charcoal from waste coffee grounds. bio-bean conducts extensive research and development into biodiesel, biochemicals and further uses for waste coffee grounds and other organic waste streams.

See also 
 Biodiesel from used coffee

References

Biodiesel
Biomass
Recycling in the United Kingdom
Coffee companies of the United Kingdom
Companies based in the City of London
British companies established in 2013
Waste management companies of the United Kingdom